François Perucel, also known as de la Rivière was an influential 16th-century French Protestant.

Having spent some time at the pastor of the French Church, London, aided by Katherine Willoughby, Duchess of Suffolk, Perucel started a colony of Protestants in Wesel, which took in many of the Marian exiles, including in time, the Duchess and her husband, Richard Bertie.

References

Year of birth missing
Year of death missing
16th-century French people
16th-century German people
16th-century English clergy
16th-century Protestants
Marian exiles
French Calvinist and Reformed ministers
English Christian religious leaders